Maria Markesini is a Greek singer and jazz pianist who lives and works in the Netherlands. She has released two albums, her debut on Universal in 2007 and  Kosmo in 2009, featuring Richard Bona and Bert van den Brink. She is currently working with Jazz Impuls.

Discography

References

External links

Official MySpace

Greek jazz musicians
Year of birth missing (living people)
Living people
21st-century Greek women singers
Greek jazz pianists
Greek women pianists
People from Cephalonia
Women jazz pianists
21st-century pianists
21st-century women pianists